Marshal of the Empire was a civil dignity in the First French Empire between 1804 and 1815. The successor of the dignity, the Marshal of France, is a five-star rank with a NATO code of OF-10, equivalent to an Admiral of France in the French Navy. The distinction was used sporadically and was vacant during parts of its history. A Marshal was a grand officer of the Empire, entitled to a high-standing position at the court and to the presidency of an electoral college. In total, 26 men were awarded a Marshal's baton. The most recent promotions to marshal came in 1815, two years after a break on routine promotions to the rank, when Napoleon promoted Emmanuel de Grouchy, one of his Generals, to the dignity.

Unlike many positions, the Marshal of the Empire distinction was not a rank, rather a reward, given out by Napoleon. Almost all officers to hold the rank of Marshal were professional soldiers in the French Army. Some, including Józef Poniatowski, served in foreign armies. Of all 26, 5 were killed in action, or by accident. One Marshal was present at the Battle of Vitoria, fought in 1813, where the Duke of Wellington earned the British equivalent of the distinction. Most had defected to the royalists before the Battle of Waterloo and Napoleon's subsequent defeat, with only four others (most notably Marshals Emmanuel de Grouchy and Michel Ney) serving under Napoleon at the Battle of Waterloo.

Auguste de Marmont, born in 1774, was the youngest officer to earn the distinction of Marshal. Francois Kellerman was the oldest, born in 1735. The majority of Marshals were given the title in 1804 (18 out of 26), while Grouchy received the distinction at the latest time, in 1815, shortly before the Battle of Waterloo.

List of Marshals

See also 

 Field Marshal (United Kingdom)

Notes

References 

Marshals
First French Empire
Marshals of the First French Empire